Sterling crisis may refer to:
 1931 sterling crisis, emergency measures during the Great Depression
 1949 sterling crisis, devaluation
 1967 sterling crisis, devaluation
 1976 sterling crisis, IMF loan
 1992 sterling crisis ("Black Wednesday"), depreciation

See also
 Currency crisis

Balance of payments
Financial crises
Economic history of the United Kingdom